Ryan Warner is a member of the Pennsylvania House of Representatives, representing the 52nd House district in Fayette County and Westmoreland County, Pennsylvania.

Career

Committee assignments 

 Appropriations
 Consumer Affairs
 Environmental Resources & Energy, Subcommittee on Energy - Chair
 Transportation

Personal 

Ryan graduated from Frazier High School in Perryopolis in 2001.

Political positions
Warner is considered politically conservative. The American Conservative Union's Center for Legislative Accountability gives him a lifetime rating of 91.78.

References

External links

PA House profile

Living people
People from Fayette County, Pennsylvania
Republican Party members of the Pennsylvania House of Representatives
21st-century American politicians
Year of birth missing (living people)